Belches may refer to:
 Peter Belches, early explorer of Western Australia;
 Point Belches, a geographic feature in the Swan River.
 Belches, physical reactions to buildup of gas in the digestive tract.